The 1959 Firecracker 250 was a NASCAR Grand National Series event that was held on July 4, 1959, at Daytona International Speedway in Daytona Beach, Florida.

Summary
Contested over 100 laps it was the twenty-sixth race of the 1959 NASCAR Grand National Series season. Fireball Roberts, driving for Jim Stephens, took his first win of the season, while Joe Weatherly finished second and Johnny Allen finished third.

Results

Timeline
Section reference: 
 Start: Fireball Roberts had the pole position to start the race with.
 Lap 3: Joe Weatherly took over the lead from Fireball Roberts.
 Lap 4: Jack Smith took over the lead from Joe Weatherly.
 Lap 5: Fireball Roberts took over the lead from Jack Smith.
 Lap 11: Elmo Langley's engine suddenly stopped working.
 Lap 16: G.C. Spencer's engine suddenly stopped working.
 Lap 27: Lee Petty's fuel pump suddenly stopped working.
 Lap 33: Jim Austin's water pump suddenly stopped working.
 Lap 42: Tom Pistone took over the lead from Fireball Roberts.
 Lap 49: Fireball Roberts took over the lead from Tom Pistone.
 Lap 60: Timing issues managed to knock Dick Foley out of the race.
 Lap 70: Charlie Cregar's engine suddenly stopped working.
 Lap 73: George Green's vehicle developed a problematic fan; forcing him out of the race.
 Lap 78: Joe Weatherly took over the lead from Fireball Roberts.
 Lap 85: Fireball Roberts took over the lead from Joe Weatherly.
 Lap 87: Dick Joslin's vehicle developed an oil leak that knocked him out of the race.
 Lap 89: Larry Frank was officially disqualified from the race.
 Finish: Fireball Roberts was officially declared the winner of the event.

References

Firecracker 250
Firecracker 250
NASCAR races at Daytona International Speedway